The Light at the End of the World or Light at the End of the World may refer to:

 Light at the End of the World, a 2007 album by Erasure
 The Light at the End of the World (A Flock of Seagulls album), 1995
 The Light at the End of the World (My Dying Bride album), 1999

See also
 The Lighthouse at the End of the World (Le Phare du bout du monde), Jules Verne's novel drafted in 1901 and published posthumously in 1905
The Light at the Edge of the World, a 1971 film based on Jules Verne's 1905 novel